Atractus emmeli, also known commonly as Emmel's ground snake and Boettger's ground snake, is a species of snake in the family Colubridae. The species is native to northwestern South America.

Etymology
The specific name, emmeli, is in honor of Ferdinand Emmel who sent the first two specimens of this snake to German herpetologist Oskar Boettger, which Boettger described as a species new to science.

Geographic range
A. emmeli is found in Bolivia and Peru, east of the Andes.

Habitat

Description
Dorsally, it is uniformly light brown, dark brown, or black. Often there is a whitish or tan band across the parietals, especially in juveniles. Ventrally, it is cream-colored, with black spots or dots. It has smooth dorsal scales, without apical pits. The dorsal scales are arranged in 15 rows throughout the length of the body (15/15/15). The ventrals number 154–187 in females, and 147–169 in males. The subcaudals number 14–25 in females, and 20–31 in males.

Behavior
A. emmeli is terrestrial and fossorial.

Reproduction
A. emmeli is oviparous.

References

Further reading
Boettger O (1888). "Beitrag zur Reptilfauna des oberen Beni in Bolivia". Bericht über die Senckenbergische Naturforschende Gesellschaft in Frankfurt am Main 1888: 191–199. (Geophis emmeli, new species, pp. 192–195, figure [three views of head]). (in German and Latin).
Boulenger GA (1894). Catalogue of the Snakes in the British Museum (Natural History). Volume II. Containing the Conclusion of the Colubridæ Aglyphæ. London: Trustees of the British Museum (Natural History). (Taylor and Francis, printers). xi + 382 pp. + Plates I–XX. (Atractus emmeli, new combination, pp. 311–312).
Freiberg M (1982). Snakes of South America. Hong Kong: T.F.H. Publications. 189 pp. . (Atractus emmeli, p. 90).
Passos P, Azevedo JAR, Nogueira CC, Fernandes R, Sawaya RJ (2019). "An Integrated Approach to Delimit Species in the Puzzling Atractus emmeli Complex (Serpentes: Dipsadidae)". Herpetological Monographs 33 (1): 1–25.

Atractus
Reptiles of Bolivia
Reptiles of Peru
Snakes of South America
Reptiles described in 1888
Taxa named by Oskar Boettger